HMS E24 was an E-class submarine of the Royal Navy built by Vickers, Barrow-in-Furness. She was launched on 9 December 1915 and was commissioned on 9 January 1916. E24 was a mine-laying submarine.

E24 was mined off Heligoland Bight on 24 March 1916. A salvage operation was attempted in 1973 as she was believed to be a German U-boat.

Design
She was powered by two  Vickers eight-cylinder two-stroke diesel engines and two  electric motors.

E24 was armed with a 2-pounder deck gun, mounted forward of the conning tower. She had five 18 inch (450 mm) torpedo tubes, two in the bow, one either side amidships, and one in the stern; a total of 10 torpedoes were carried.

E-Class submarines had wireless systems with  power ratings; in some submarines, these were later upgraded to  systems by removing a midship torpedo tube. Their maximum design depth was  although in service some reached depths of below . Some submarines contained Fessenden oscillator systems.

Crew
Her complement was three officers and 28 men.

Loss
E24 belonged to the Harwich-based 9th Flotilla at the time of her loss. She was the second E-class boat to be converted into a minelayer. E24 left Harwich on the morning of 21 March 1916 to lay mines in the Heligoland Bight. A positional report was issued late that night. Her commander, Lieutenant-Commander George W.E. Naper, was ordered to enter the Bight in darkness on the surface via the Amrum Bank. Once in position he was to lay mines in a zigzag formation. As mines were known to have been laid by the Germans off Ameland, Naper was ordered to return by the same route. She did not return from the mission, and was logged as missing on 24 March 1916.

Salvage

Divers hunting for a Second World War-era U-boat in 1973 raised sections of a mined submarine wreck, including the conning tower. The boat was towed to Cuxhaven where the wreck was identified as a British E-class boat, rather than a German submarine. The German government then informed the Admiralty.

Human remains found in the wreck are buried in Ohlsdorf Cemetery, Hamburg. E24s commander is buried in a separate grave to others. Lieutenant-Commander Naper was identified because of the 2+half rings on sleeve, and the fact that his skeleton was 6 ft tall. All the skulls of those in the boat were found in a pyramidal formation. The sunken wreck lay at a downward angle, causing the heads to become detached from the bodies and to roll down the slope into that position. Three bodies were found lying under the battery boards directly on top of the batteries, with arms folded. They may have died of the effects of chlorine gas before the rest of the crew. Artefacts from E24 and her crew, such as smoking pipes belonging to Naper, a bottle of blackberries, the sextant, a firing pistol and boots are on display at Cuxhaven, as are the submarine's conning tower and propellers.

References

External links
'Submarine losses 1904 to present day' - Royal Navy Submarine Museum 
War memorial outside the Parish Church of St Mary, Sullington, West Sussex - Public Sculptures of Sussex

British E-class submarines of the Royal Navy
Ships built in Barrow-in-Furness
1915 ships
World War I submarines of the United Kingdom
Maritime incidents in 1916
1916 disasters in the United Kingdom
World War I shipwrecks in the North Sea
Royal Navy ship names
Ships sunk by mines